B18 or B-18 may refer to:

 Alton Bay Seaplane Base (FAA LID: B18)
 B-18 Bolo, an American bomber aircraft by Douglas based on the Douglas DC-2
 B 18, a Swedish bomber aircraft made by SAAB
 B18 (New York City bus) serving Brooklyn
 B18 road (Cyprus)
 Caro-Kann Defence, in chess (Encyclopaedia of Chess Openings code B18) 
 HLA-B18, an HLA-B serotype
 Honda B engine
 Volvo B18 engine
 Boron-18 (B-18 or 18B), an isotope of boron
 LNER Class B18, classified B1 until 1943